The 2010–11 Alabama Crimson Tide men's basketball team (variously "Alabama", "UA", "Bama" or "The Tide") represented the University of Alabama in the 2010–2011 college basketball season. The team's head coach was Anthony Grant, who entered his second season after posting a 17–15 record in his inaugural season. The team played its home games at Coleman Coliseum in Tuscaloosa, Alabama and was a member of the Southeastern Conference. This was the 98th season of basketball in the school's history.

Pre-season
The 2009–10 season, the 1st under head coach Anthony Grant, saw the Tide finish the season 17–15 (6–10 SEC), while losing two key players to injury. The Crimson Tide had four players graduate and one transfer after the season ended, including the starting point guard. They also brought in four key freshman recruits and 1 junior college transfer. JaMychal Green was selected to the SEC Pre-season 2nd team, while the team was picked to finish 3rd in the western division of the SEC.

Roster

Source: Rolltide.com 2010–11 Roster

Depth chart

Schedule and results

|-
!colspan=10 style=|Exhibition
|-

|-
!colspan=10 style=| Regular season

|-
!colspan=10 style=| SEC tournament
|-

|-
!colspan=10 style=| NIT
|-

Source: 2010–11 Schedule. Rolltide.com

Class of 2011 signees

See also
Iron Bowl of Basketball
2011 NCAA Men's Division I Basketball Tournament
2010–11 NCAA Division I men's basketball season
2010–11 NCAA Division I men's basketball rankings

References

Alabama
Alabama Crimson Tide men's basketball seasons
Alabama
2010 in sports in Alabama
Alabama Crimson Tide